Eric Randolph Close (born May 24, 1967) is an American actor, best known for his roles in television series, particularly as FBI agent Martin Fitzgerald in the CBS mystery drama Without a Trace (2002–2009) and Teddy Conrad in the ABC musical drama Nashville (2012–2017).

Early life
Close was born in Staten Island, New York. Close's father is an orthopedic surgeon. Close is the eldest of three brothers. His family moved to Indiana, then to Michigan, and finally settled in San Diego when Close was seven years old.

Close was a member of the Sigma Chi fraternity and graduated with a B.A. in communications from the University of Southern California in 1989.

Career
Close was interested in acting from an early age and had some stage experience in school, but did not decide to pursue an acting career until after college. His first role was in a theater production Rat Songs in L.A., after which he was offered parts in the crime drama American Me (1992) and the TV movie Safe House directed by Elena Mannus. He had a brief stint in daytime television when he played Sawyer Walker on the NBC daytime soap opera Santa Barbara from 1992 to 1993. He received a Soap Opera Digest Award nomination for Outstanding Male Newcomer for his role as Sawyer Walker on Santa Barbara. Close later starred on short-lived primetime shows such as McKenna (1994–1995), Dark Skies (1996–1997), The Magnificent Seven (1998–1999), Now and Again (1999–2000), and the Steven Spielberg miniseries production, Taken (2002). He starred on storyline online and read when Picasso met Mootise.

Close is best known for his role as FBI agent Martin Fitzgerald on the CBS mystery drama Without a Trace. The show ran for seven seasons from September 26, 2002 to May 19, 2009.  From 2011 to 2015, Close had a recurring role as Travis Tanner in the USA legal drama Suits, and starred as Michael Dorset in the short-lived CBS comedy-drama Chaos. In 2012, Close began co-starring with Connie Britton in the ABC musical drama Nashville as Teddy Conrad, initially the husband of country singer Rayna Jaymes (Britton) and later the mayor of Nashville.

Filmography

Film

Television

References

External links

 
 Eric Close's Official Twitter
 Eric Close - CBS Bio

1967 births
Male actors from San Diego
American male film actors
American male stage actors
American male television actors
Living people
American Presbyterians
People from Staten Island
USC Annenberg School for Communication and Journalism alumni
Male actors from New York (state)
20th-century American male actors
21st-century American male actors